This list of 1950 motorsport champions is a list of national or international auto racing series with a Championship decided by the points or positions earned by a driver from multiple races.

Formula cars

Stock car racing

Motorcycle

See also
 List of motorsport championships
 Auto racing

1950 in motorsport
1950